Alexander Nikolaevich Dranishnikov (Александр Николаевич Дранишников, born  5 February 1958) is a Russian-American mathematician, focusing in geometry and topology, currently a Distinguished Professor at the University of Florida. In 1998 he was an Invited Speaker at the International Congress of Mathematicians in Berlin. In 2012 he became one of the inaugural fellows of the American Mathematical Society.

References

External links
Dranishnikov Alexander Nikolaevich, mathnet.ru

1958 births
Living people
University of Florida faculty
Russian mathematicians
20th-century American mathematicians
Fellows of the American Mathematical Society
21st-century American mathematicians